Trevor is a community in the village of Salem Lakes in Kenosha County, Wisconsin, United States. Trevor is south of Paddock Lake. Trevor has a post office with ZIP code 53179.

Notable people
Walker M. Curtiss, farmer and legislator

References

Populated places in Kenosha County, Wisconsin
Neighborhoods in Wisconsin